Thomas Wylie (1841–1915) was an Ontario physician and political figure.

Thomas Wylie may also refer to:
Thomas Wyllie (1872–1943), Scottish footballer (Liverpool)
Tom Wylie (footballer, born 1896) (1896–?), Scottish footballer (Blackburn Rovers)
Tom Wylie (footballer, born 1907) (1907–?), Scottish footballer (Sunderland)